H. James Burgwyn (born 1936) is an American historian. He is a West Chester University emeritus professor of history, and an authority on the foreign policy and military strategy of Italy in the period from World War I to World War II.

Bergwyn lives in Philadelphia, Pennsylvania.

Published works
 The Legend of the Mutilated Victory: Italy, the Great War, and the Paris Peace Conference, 1915–1919, Greenwood Press (1993) 
 Italian Foreign Policy in the Interwar Period: 1918-1940, Praeger Publishers (1997) 
 Empire on the Adriatic: Mussolini's Conquest of Yugoslavia 1941–1943, Enigma Books (2005) 
 Mussolini Warlord: Failed Dreams of Empire, 1940-1943, Enigma Books (2013), 
 Mussolini and the Salò Republic, 1943 - 1945: The Failure of a Puppet Regime, Palgrave MacMillan (2018),

References

1936 births
Living people
Writers from Philadelphia
University of Pennsylvania faculty
21st-century American historians
21st-century American male writers
West Chester University faculty
20th-century American non-fiction writers
American male non-fiction writers
20th-century American male writers